Schöckl (also spelt Schöckel) is a mountain in the Austrian state of Styria. It is about 14 km north of the city center of Graz, the capital of Styria.

There is a cableway to the summit from the nearby health resort of St Radegund.

In 1931, the rocket designer Friedrich Schmiedl began a rocket mail service here, launching rockets to St Radegund.

Schöckl Transmitter is situated on the mountain.

References

Mountains of the Alps
Mountains of Styria
Graz Highlands